Agents of Good Roots is an American rock band from Richmond, Virginia.

The group formed in 1995 and toured heavily on college campuses in the middle of the decade. They independently released two records before signing to RCA Records, after which they toured with Dave Matthews Band and scored two rock radio hits, "Come on" and "Smiling Up the Frown". The band recorded a single music video, entitled "Come On (Let Your Blood Come Alive)", in 1998 that was paired with the release of their RCA album, One by One. It was played briefly on MTV during the summer months of 1998.
The band went dormant in 2006, but reunited for several live shows in 2017, with plans to tour and record in 2018. They also launched a new website.

Members
Brian Jones – drums & vocals
J. C. Kuhl – saxophone
Stewart Myers – bass guitar & vocals
Andrew Winn – vocals, guitar, & keyboards

Past members
Kevin Hamilton  – bass
Rick Rieger  – saxophone

Discography

Studio albums
Where'd You Get That Vibe? (1996)
Straight Around (1997)
One by One (RCA Records, 1998) U.S. Heatseekers #44 Produced by Paul Fox and Mixed by Tom Lord-Alge
Needle and Thread (ATO Records, 2000)

Extended plays
Seed (EP) (2000)

Singles
"Smiling Up the Frown" (1998) U.S. Adult Alternative Songs No. 5
"Come On (Let Your Blood Come Alive)" (1998) U.S. Modern Rock Tracks No. 37
"Miss Misbelieving" (1998)
"Upspin" (1998) U.S. Adult Alternative Songs No. 15
"Bomb Silo" (2019) digital
"Miguel and the Bull" (2020) digital
"Blood Brothers" (2020) digital 
"You Come Runnin’" (2020) digital

References

External links
 Dozens of Live Shows
 Official Band Website

Rock music groups from Virginia
Jam bands
Richmond, Virginia
Musical quartets
RCA Records artists
Musical groups established in 1995
ATO Records artists
1995 establishments in Virginia